Prototype is an album by trumpeter/composer Wallace Roney which was recorded in 2004 and released on the HighNote label.

Reception

On All About Jazz, John Kelman noted "Roney has chosen a starting point for his music—that of the transitional Miles period of Nefertiti through Filles de Kilimanjaro — and steadfastly evolved the idea, incorporating contemporary technologies and rhythms, painting a picture of where Miles might have gone had he been more evolutionary than revolutionary ... Prototype continues to evolve Roney's conception of jazz, one that successfully combines inarguable roots with a more contemporary view, incorporating a diversity of influences into a blend where the fundamental notion is that of freedom, but, like Miles before him, with a clearly-defined rhythmic and harmonic basis". 
In JazzTimes, Mike Shanley wrote: "Prototype has a definite modern feel, fastening 1960s Miles Davis ambience to modern R&B and technology. ... Maybe now jaded listeners will look beyond Roney’s association with Miles Davis and appreciate him for his own ideas". The Observer's Dave Gelly said " This CD uses elements of hip hop, electronics and even turntables without sacrificing the immediacy and individuality of jazz performance. His playing has a poise and assurance that few can match, while his band supports him admirably".

Track listing 
All compositions by Wallace Roney except where noted
 "Cyberspace" (Ronnie Burrage) – 7:48
 "Shadow Dance" – 10:37
 "Prototype" (André Benjamin) – 6:13
 "Then and Now" (Antoine Roney) – 4:49
 "Let's Stay Together" (Al Green, Willie Mitchell, Al Jackson Jr.) – 4:59
 "Quadrant" – 6:18
 "Three Views of the Blues" – 5:19
 "Secret Identity" (Adam Holzman) – 7:36

Personnel 
Wallace Roney – trumpet
Antoine Roney – soprano saxophone, tenor saxophone (tracks 1-4 & 6-8)
Don Byron – bass clarinet (track 2)
Clifton Anderson – trombone (track 2)
Geri Allen – piano, Fender Rhodes piano (tracks 2-7)
Adam Holzman – keyboards, Fender Rhodes piano, piano (tracks 1, 2 & 6-8)
Matthew Garrison – double bass, electric bass
Eric Allen – drums
DJ Logic – turntables (tracks 1, 6 & 7)

References 

Wallace Roney albums
2004 albums
HighNote Records albums